Linden House may refer to:

in England
Linden House, Hammersmith, London, clubhouse of the London Corinthian Sailing Club

in the United States
(by state then city)
Linden House (847 Linden Ave., Long Beach, California)
Linden House (Marietta, Pennsylvania), listed on the NRHP in Lancaster County
Linden House (Vermillion, South Dakota), NRHP-listed

See also
Linden Hall (disambiguation)
The Lindens (disambiguation)
Linden (disambiguation)